ungoogled-chromium is a free and open-source variant of the Chromium web browser that removes all Google-specific web services. It achieves this with a series of patches applied to the Chromium codebase during the compilation process. The result is functionally similar to regular Chromium.

Features 

 Disabling functionality that requires Google domains, including Google Safe Browsing.
 Replacing Google web domains in the Chromium source code with non-existent web domains and blocking internal requests to those domains.
 Removing binary blobs from the Chromium source code and replacing them with custom alternatives.

The browser also adds smaller non-essential features such as flags protecting against fingerprinting and borrows features from other projects such as Debian. Some Chromium features do not work on ungoogled-chromium, a notable one being installing extensions directly from the Chrome Web Store.

History 
The ungoogled-chromium project was founded by a hobbyist with the user name Eloston in 2015. It was first developed for Linux, then for other operating systems. Eloston used to release builds, but eventually he stopped doing so and allowed others to provide builds with his patches.

Starting in 2019, Eloston greatly reduced his involvement in the project, and other hobbyists have continued to maintain the patches. In 2022, the GitHub repository was transferred from Eloston's personal account to a new "ungoogled-software" account.

References

External links 
 
 

Free web browsers